

Powder blue is a pale shade of blue.
As with most colours, there is no absolute definition of its exact hue. Originally, powder blue, in the 1650s, was powdered smalt (cobalt glass) used in laundering and dyeing applications, and it then came to be used as a colour name from 1894.

Smalt has a deep, dark blue hue, but powder blue nowadays is a pale cobalt blue as illustrated by the examples below, which show powder blue as defined by British and Australian Standards for paint colours along with an example of one manufacturer's actual Powder Blue paint, and a consensus definition produced by an online colour names survey in which 140,000 people took part. The sources differ on how pale or saturated a colour it is, but broadly agree on the hue.

Powder blue was also used as a colour name in English in 1774, but the exact colour is unclear: it may be a blue-grey or a dark unsaturated blue.

Web colour

In contrast to the above examples, the list of X11 color names defines powder blue as a pale cyan shade, RGB(176,224,230), as shown here. This is the colour which is displayed by web browsers if "powder blue" is specified in HTML or CSS code.

Crayola colour

Displayed at right is the colour that is called "powder blue" in Crayola crayons. This colour was introduced for the Colors of Kindness set in 2022.

See also
 List of colors

References

External links
 Smalt at Web Exhibits' Pigments Through the Ages

Shades of blue